Her Twelve Men is a 1954 American comedy drama film starring Oscar-winning Greer Garson and Robert Ryan, directed by Robert Z. Leonard, and written by William Roberts and Laura Z. Hobson. This MGM production was based on the best-selling pseudo-autobiographical book written by Louise Maxwell Baker, Snips and Snails. Baker herself taught at an all-boys boarding school, as the only female teacher in the school. Subsequently, Louise recounts many of the funny stories from her time as a teacher in Snips and Snails, which then translates into the film, Her Twelve Men.

Plot
Although she has no teaching experience, widow Jan Stewart is hired by headmaster Dr. Barrett to be the first woman to teach at The Oaks boarding school. Due to the fact that she is the only woman teaching at the school, the other faculty members either are condescending towards her or try to woo her.

Jan gets to know her twelve students and fellow faculty member Joe Hargrave, who is dating the rich Barbara Dunning. Her young students hate her at first as she gives a strict punishment to a few boys who are disrupting her class; however, they begin to appreciate her nurturing and kind nature, and she begins to serve as mother for many of the boys who miss their actual parents. She has so much sympathy for one young boy, Bobby Lennox, whose globe-trotting parents neglect him, that she reads letters pretending they are from his mother that Jan wrote herself.

A wealthy Texan widower, Richard Oliver, enrolls his son. Richard Jr. instantly alienates the other boys with his attitude and by refusing to confess to causing a fire alarm to go off, for which Dr. Barrett punishes the entire class. The other students in the class then all alienate Richard Jr., as he does not own up to his wrongdoing. This ultimately results in Richard Jr. being pushed out of a second-story window by the other students, causing him to break his leg.

The boy's father wants him sent home and Jan is asked to accompany him on the journey. She wins young Richard's trust and gains Richard Sr.'s interest as well. Richard Jr. starts to treat Jan as a mother figure, as he severely misses his late mother. Later, Richard Sr. ends up proposing to Jan because of his feelings for her, as well as his son's, but Jan and Joe Hargrave ultimately realize they were meant for one another. Jan decides to continue to teach at The Oaks for another year after being begged by Joe Hargrave and her students. Richard Jr. also reconciles with the other students, and appears to finally be happy at The Oaks.

Cast
Greer Garson as  Jan Stewart 
Robert Ryan as  Joe Hargrave 
Barry Sullivan as  Richard Y. Oliver, Sr. 
Richard Haydn as Dr. Avord Barrett 
Barbara Lawrence as  Barbara Dunning 
James Arness as  Ralph Munsey 
Rex Thompson as  Homer Curtis 
Tim Considine as Richard Y. Oliver, Jr. 
David Stollery as  Jeff Carlin 
Frances Bergen as  Sylvia Carlin 
Ian Wolfe as  Roger Frane 
Donald MacDonald as  Bobby Lennox 
Dale Hartleben as  Kevin Ellison Clark III 
Ivan Triesault as  Erik Haldeman

Reception
According to MGM record the film earned $817,000 in the US and Canada and $601,000 elsewhere, resulting in a loss of $116,000.

References

External links

Her Twelve Men on Rotten Tomatoes

1954 films
1954 comedy-drama films
American comedy-drama films
Films set in boarding schools
Films about educators
Films directed by Robert Z. Leonard
Films scored by Bronisław Kaper
Metro-Goldwyn-Mayer films
Films with screenplays by William Roberts (screenwriter)
Films based on autobiographies
Films about widowhood
1950s English-language films
1950s American films